John Pulido (born October 3, 1981) is a Colombian  former footballer.

Career

Youth and College
Pulido grew up in Miami, Florida, attended American High School, winning a high school championship in 1999, and played college soccer at Florida International University.

Professional
Pulido was drafted in the sixth round (55th overall) of the 2004 MLS SuperDraft by the Colorado Rapids, but was not offered a contract by the team. Instead, Pulido played with Colorado's development team, Boulder Rapids Reserve, in the USL Premier Development League, and featured for Boulder in the 2004 PDL Championship game.

His rights were traded to FC Dallas in June 2005 for a fourth-round pick in the 2006 MLS Supplemental Draft. After a spell with FC Dallas's reserve side in 2005, Pulido was signed by USL First Division side Miami FC prior to their inaugural season in 2006. He was Miami's club captain in 2008 and stayed with the club until 2009.

References

External links
Miami FC bio

1981 births
Living people
Colombian footballers
FIU Panthers men's soccer players
Colorado Rapids U-23 players
FC Dallas players
Miami FC (2006) players
USL League Two players
USL First Division players
Colorado Rapids draft picks
Association football midfielders
Footballers from Barranquilla
21st-century Colombian people